Polygon is a Russian research and production enterprise engaged in the development, production and servicing of electronic and telecommunications equipment. The company produces switches, routers, converters, gateways for the needs of mobile operators, industrial companies, departmental bodies, public authorities and other customers.

The company is a backbone enterprise in the Republic of Bashkortostan and is actively involved in the import substitution program. Polygon products satisfy the provisions of the decree of the Ministry of Industry and Trade of the Russian Federation No. 1399 from June 3, 2015 "On confirmation of the assignment and telecommunications equipment, produced in the territory of the Russian Federation, the telecommunication equipment of Russian origin status".

History 

 1941 - Organization of the plant "Ufimkabel" on the basis of the evacuated enterprises.
 1985 - Creation of the Ufa Center of Scientific and Technical Creativity of Youth (STCY).
 1988 - Creation of Polygon, SPE.
 1992 - Victory in the tender of BETO corporation to manufacture fiber-optic linear path for the compounds stations MT-20 and its outstations.
 1996 - The transition to the active use of programmable logic integrated circuits (FPGAs) as the basis of the device architecture.
 2006 - The development of the first domestic switch.
 2013 - Expert council of ANO "Agency of strategic projects for the promotion of new initiatives" ASI approved business project "Development of domestic production of telecommunication equipment", initiated by Polygon, SPE.

Products 

 Switches and Ethernet equipment
 Industrial switches with IP30 protection level and higher
 FTTx equipment
 TDMoIP gateways
 Optical modems and multiplexers E1 / Ethernet
 Redundancy equipment
 Bridges Ethernet over E1
 Converters RS-232 and RS-485 - Ethernet
 E1 access devices

Primary activities 

 Full cycle of development, production and implementation of telecommunications equipment
 Creation of special software
 Marketing and sales
 Customer service and technical support
 Execution of special orders for the development of telecommunications equipment
 Staff training and education

Notes 

Produced devices are certified in the "System of certification in the field of communication." The quality management system complies with the requirements of GOST RV 0015-002- 2012, ISO 9001: 2008 and Standard ISO 9001-2011.
The company is a regular participant in the annual trade fair Interpolitech.

References 

 Import substitution in telecommunications: a course on the "Polygon" Russian
 TV channel "Russia 24". "Strategic Initiatives" series. Release 2. COMPARED with foreign counterparts Russian telecommunications equipment is much lower in price. Russian
 The company OAO NPP "Polygon" starts production of industrial switch series "Inzer-2000" Russian
 IT companies of Bashkortostan presented its products at the exhibition in the framework of the forum "TRAC-IT.2016» Russian
 We do all the work ourselves. Russian

Networking hardware companies
Telecommunications equipment vendors